Hungry is an album of worship songs from Vineyard UK. It was recorded live in London, England and produced by Brian Doerksen and Nigel Hemming. This particular album is copyrighted by Vineyard Records UK.

This album was originally released as Hungry in 1999 by Vineyard Music UK Ltd. The album achieved platinum status in this incarnation. In 2005 this album was re-released as Vineyard Music UK; re-branded to Vineyard Records UK (VRUK).

Track listing
"Hungry (Falling on My Knees)"  - 5:41
"Your Name Is Holy"  - 5:22
"Humble King"  - 4:44
"There's No One Like Our God" - 3:27
"Make Your Home in Me" - 4:56
"Child Of God"  - 4:49
"Be the Centre"  - 6:56
"All Creation"  - 4:15
"The Rhythm Of Heaven"  - 5:17
"I Surrender"  - 5:00
"Only You"  - 4:59
"Refuge in You"  - 3:47
"You Are a Holy God"  - 5:32
"Breathe"  - 6:30

Track performers and writers

Hungry lists the following song writing credits:

References

1999 live albums
Live Christian music albums